"Thinking About Tomorrow" was a 2002 single by English songwriter Beth Orton. It was released on CD, and peaked at #57 in the UK charts. The song appears on the album Daybreaker and Pass in Time: The Definitive Collection. 
The song was also featured in the pilot episode of the ABC show The Nine, on the soundtrack of the movie How to Deal (2003), and on an episode of Charmed.

Track listing

CD: Heavenly / HVN 129CD United Kingdom 

 "Thinking About Tomorrow (Ben Watt Radio Mix)" - 3:32
 "Daybreaker (Roots Manuva mix)" - 4:36
 "Daybreaker (Four Tet mix)" - 5:07

References

Beth Orton songs
2002 singles
2002 songs
Songs written by Beth Orton
Heavenly Recordings singles
Astralwerks singles